(5496) 1973 NA, is a very eccentric and heavily tilted asteroid, classified as near-Earth object of the Apollo group, approximately 2 kilometers in diameter. It was discovered on 4 July 1973, by American astronomer Eleanor Helin at the U.S. Palomar Observatory in California. At the time of its discovery, it was the most highly inclined minor planet known to exist. It may be the parent body of the Quadrantids.

Parent of the Quadrantids 

 is a possible parent body of the Quadrantids, a major meteor shower that occurs every January. It may also be just a fragment of the parent or the dormant remains of the parent.

Orbit and classification 

The asteroid orbits the Sun at a distance of 0.9–4.0 AU once every 3 years and 10 months (1,388 days). Its orbit has an eccentricity of 0.64 and an inclination of 68° with respect to the ecliptic. No precoveries were taken. The asteroid's observation arc even begins 2 days after its discovery.

The body was also one of the first known near-Earth asteroids. Its discovery happened just two days after it had passed  from Earth on one of its closest approaches ever computed. It was then tracked for more than a month, but was not seen again until its next close approach in 1992, when it was recovered by the Siding Spring Observatory in Australia. Its minimum orbit intersection distance with Earth is now .

Physical characteristics 

The stony S-type asteroid is also classified as a transitional C/X-type according to observations by the NASA IRTF telescope. A rotational lightcurve for this asteroid was obtained by American astronomer Brian Skiff from photometric observations made in June 2011. Lightcurve analysis gave a well-defined rotation period of  hours with a brightness variation of 0.15 magnitude. The Collaborative Asteroid Lightcurve Link assumes a standard albedo for stony asteroids of 0.20 and calculates a diameter of 1.88 kilometers with an absolute magnitude of 16.0.

Notes

References

External links 
 Asteroid Lightcurve Database (LCDB), query form (info )
 Dictionary of Minor Planet Names, Google books
 Asteroids and comets rotation curves, CdR – Observatoire de Genève, Raoul Behrend
 
 
 

005496
Discoveries by Eleanor F. Helin
19730704